Ravitria is a genus of moths in the family Sesiidae.

Species
Ravitria aurifasciata (Gorbunov & Arita, 1995)
Ravitria confusa (Gorbunov & Arita, 2000c)
Ravitria pyrosema (Hampson, 1919)
Ravitria sotchivkoi (Gorbunov & Arita, 1999)
Ravitria yunnanensis Gorbunov & Arita, 2001

References

Sesiidae